The 2019 Big Sky Conference women's basketball tournament was a postseason tournament that was held from March 11–15, 2019 at CenturyLink Arena in Boise, Idaho. Portland State was the winner of the Big Sky tournament earns an automatic bid to the 2019 NCAA tournament.

Seeds

Big Sky tiebreaker procedures are as follows:
Head-to-head
Performance against conference teams in descending order to finish
Higher RPI
Coin Flip

* Overall record at end of regular season.

Schedule

Bracket

* denotes overtime period

See also
 2019 Big Sky Conference men's basketball tournament

References

2018–19 Big Sky Conference women's basketball season
Big Sky Conference women's basketball tournament
2019 in sports in Idaho
College basketball tournaments in Idaho
Basketball competitions in Boise, Idaho
Women's sports in Idaho